The banded water snake or southern water snake (Nerodia fasciata) is a species of mostly aquatic, nonvenomous, colubrid snakes endemic to the Midwest and Southeastern United States.

Geographic range
N. fasciata is natively found from Indiana, south to Louisiana, and east to Florida.

In 1992, its congener Nerodia sipedon (northern or common water snake) and it were found in three sites in California by the US Fish and Wildlife Service (USFWS). In 2009, more than 300 banded water snakes were caught in suburbs of Los Angeles by the Nerodia Working Group of USFWS. Then in May 2016, the species was found in the Colorado River basin near Yuma, Arizona. Further trapping did indeed catch large numbers of them, indicating that a thriving invasive population exists in that area.

Description

It is typically gray, greenish-gray, or brown in color, with dark crossbanding. Many specimens are so dark in color that their patterning is barely discernible. The ventrum (belly) is typically an off-white to white. They have flat heads, and are fairly heavy-bodied. Banded water snakes may also be identified by a dark stripe which extends from the eye to the angle of the jaw. If irritated, they release a foul-smelling musk to deter predators. This species also exhibits sexual dimorphism in which the female is generally longer and heavier than the male.

Their appearance leads them to be frequently mistaken for other snakes with which they share a habitat, including the venomous cottonmouth.

Habitat
N. fasciata inhabits most freshwater environments such as lakes, marshes, ponds, and streams. Banded water snakes are active both day and night and may be seen basking on logs or branches overhanging the water or foraging in shallow water. They will typically stay within emergent vegetation along the shoreline or in the shallow littoral zone of their habitat.

Diet
The species preys mainly on fish and frogs. On occasion, they prey on small turtles, small snakes, birds, earthworms, and crayfish. Juveniles mainly consume fish and shift towards eating frogs as adults. This shift may be caused by large frogs being mechanically too difficult for juveniles to consume (which may suggest juveniles may be unable to open their jaws wide enough for adult frogs), because large frogs are energetically too costly for juveniles to catch, or because juveniles are at risk if swallowing prey requires a long time.

Using its vomeronasal organ, also called Jacobson's organ, the snake can detect parvalbumins in the cutaneous mucus of its prey.

Reproduction
The species is viviparous, giving birth to live young. The brood size varies from 15 to 20 young born in late July or August. Newborns are 200–240 mm (about 8.0–9.5 in) in total length. The banded water snake is able to hybridize with the common watersnake, although this is not frequent. Physical characteristics are insufficient to distinguish such hybrids, and DNA analysis is required.

Subspecies
The three recognized subspecies of N. fasciata, including the nominotypical subspecies, are:
N. f. confluens (Blanchard, 1923) - Broad-banded water snake  - Oklahoma, Arkansas, Louisiana, Mississippi, Missouri, East Texas.
N. f. fasciata (Linnaeus, 1766) - East Texas, Louisiana, southeastern Oklahoma, Arkansas, western Mississippi, southern Alabama, Florida, southern Georgia, South Carolina, North Carolina, southeast Missouri and Illinois.
N. f. pictiventris (Cope, 1895) – Florida banded water snake - Florida, southeast Georgia. Introduced to Brownsville, Texas and California.

Taxonomy
Some sources consider N. clarkii compressicauda and N. clarkii taeniata to be subspecies of N. fasciata. Also, some sources have considered Nerodia fasciata to be a subspecies of Nerodia sipedon.

References

Other sources
Herps of Texas: Nerodia fasciata

External links

California Nerodia Watch – iNaturalist
Florida Watersnake – Nerodia fasciata pictiventris

Further reading
Linnaeus, C. 1766. Systema naturæ per regna tria naturæ, secundum classes, ordines, genera, species, cum characteribus, differentiis, synonymis, locis. Tomus I. Editio Duodecima, Reformata. L. Salvius. Stockholm. 532 pp. (Coluber fasciatus, p. 378.)

Nerodia
Articles containing video clips
Extant Pleistocene first appearances
Reptiles described in 1766
Taxa named by Carl Linnaeus
Reptiles of the United States
Fauna of the Southeastern United States